"Doubt" is the second single from alternative dance band, Delphic to be released from their debut album Acolyte. The single was released in the United Kingdom on 18 January 2010, where it debuted at number 79 on the UK Singles Chart.

Release
The single "Doubt" was released in multiple formats, including a CD, a digital download, a 7" vinyl and a 12" vinyl. Both the cover of the 7" and 12" differ from that of the original. The 12" was also a Blue Remix Vinyl and was limited to only 300 copies.

"Doubt" was selected as Single of the Week on Australia's iTunes, which ran from 26 January until 2 February.

Doubt was also issued as a promo cd single by Chimeric Records under exclusive license to Polydor Ltd (UK) in 2009.

Music video
The music video for Doubt is very heavily computer generated. It features topless people sitting down in a plain room, whilst several computer-generated images move across their bodies.

Track listing

Chart performance

References

2010 singles
Songs written by Richard Boardman
2010 songs
Polydor Records singles
Delphic songs